Qareh Tappeh (also known as Lak, Lāk-e ‘Olyā, Lāk-e Soflá, Līyek, Qara Tepe, Qareh Tappeh ‘Olya va Soflā, Qareh Tappeh-ye Bālā, Qareh Tappeh-ye ‘Olyā va Soflá, and Qareh Tappeh-ye Pā’īn) is a village in Guney-ye Gharbi Rural District, Tasuj District, Shabestar County, East Azerbaijan Province, Iran. At the 2006 census, its population was 1,768, in 496 families.

References 

Populated places in Shabestar County